Asplenium complanatum is a species of fern in the family Aspleniaceae. It is native to Seychelles. It is listed as critically endangered by the IUCN.

References

complanatum
Flora of Seychelles